David Alexander Cadman Marshall (29 December 1935 – 2 January 2019) was an English first-class cricketer and educator.

Marshall was born in December 1935 at Dore, Yorkshire. He was educated at Rugby School, before going up to Brasenose College, Oxford. While studying at Oxford, he made a single appearance in first-class cricket for Oxford University against the Free Foresters at Oxford in 1957. Batting twice in the match, he ended the Oxford first innings of 347 for 6 declared unbeaten on 54, while in their second innings of 166 for 5 he was unbeaten on 14.

After graduating from Oxford, Marshall became a schoolteacher. He became the headmaster of Musselburgh Grammar School in August 1967. He died in January 2019 at Bourton, Warwickshire. His brother, John, also played first-class cricket.

References

External links

1935 births
2019 deaths
People from Dore
People educated at Rugby School
Alumni of Brasenose College, Oxford
English cricketers
Oxford University cricketers
Heads of schools in Scotland